This is a timeline of the history of the British broadcaster Television South West (TSW) and its predecessor Westward Television. Between them, they provided the ITV service for the South West of England from 1961 to 1992.

Westward
 1961
 29 April – Westward Television starts broadcasting. Westward had fought off 11 competing bids to win the licence to broadcast to south west England.
 1962
 No events.
 1963
 No events.
 1964
 Westward is given a three-year extension to its licence. This is later extended by a further year.
 1965
 No events.
 1966
 No events.
 1967
 The Independent Television Authority renews Westward's licence for a further seven years.
 1968
 22 April – The Huntshaw Cross transmitting station opens, providing better reception across north Devon.
 August – A technicians strike forces ITV off the air for several weeks although management manage to launch a temporary ITV Emergency National Service with no regional variations.
 September – The final edition of Westward's listings magazine Look Westward is published. Listings are subsequently carried in a Westward edition of TVTimes which now becomes a national publication.
 1969
 17 January – Westward merges with the Keith Prowse company, due to Westward's chairman Peter Cadbury also being chairman of Keith Prowse.
 Later in 1969 – EMI purchases Keith Prowse Music Publishing from Westward.
 1970
 January – Peter Cadbury is sacked, and rehired within days as the chairman of the Westward board, after he made outspoken remarks against the levy imposed on advertising revenue imposed by the IBA.
 1971
 22 May — Westward Television starts broadcasting in colour from the Redruth transmitter.
 13 September – Westward begins broadcasting in colour from the Stockland Hill and Caradon Hill transmitters, and to mark the change, Westward's ident is reshot in colour.
 1972
 16 October – Following a law change which removed all restrictions on broadcasting hours, ITV is able to launch an afternoon service.
 1973 
 5 November – Colour transmissions begin from the Huntshaw Cross transmitter.
 1974 
 The 1974 franchise round sees no changes in ITV's contractors as it is felt that the huge cost in switching to colour television would have made the companies unable to compete against rivals in a franchise battle.
 1975
 No events.
 1976
 No events.
 1977
 No events.
 1978
 No events.
 1979
 10 August – The ten week ITV strike forces Westward Television off the air. The strike ends on 24 October although Westward staff returned to work a few days before the rest of the country.
 1980
 28 December – The Independent Broadcasting Authority announces that Westward has lost its franchise to TSW.
 1981
 Early in 1981 – Rather than waiting until after its franchise ends, Westward's management decide to sell up quickly to TSW which purchases Westward Television for £2.38 million.
 12 August – TSW goes on air in all but name, continuing to use the Westward name until the end of the year.
 31 December – At just before midnight, Westward Television says goodbye rather than at the end of the day's programmes as the other companies that lost their franchises did.

TSW
 1982
 1 January – TSW launches at midnight and closes down for the night 40 minutes later with TSW branding.
 1983
 TSW concludes a two-year £4 million investment programme in its studios which sees the introduction of new production equipment and the building of an additional studio.
 1984
 No events.
 1985
 3 January – The last day of transmission using the 405-lines system.
 May – TSW unveils a computerised version of its ident.
 1986
 Channel Television switches its feed of the ITV network from TSW to TVS.
 1987
 7 September – Following the transfer of ITV Schools to Channel 4, ITV provides a full morning programme schedule, with advertising, for the first time. The new service includes regular five-minute national and regional news bulletins.
 TSW changes the name of its regional news programme from Today South West to Today.
 1988
 2 September – TSW begins 24-hour broadcasting.
 1989
 TSW renames its news programme from Today to TSW Today.
 Autumn – TSW chooses to refresh its on-screen presentation rather than use the 1989 ITV corporate look.
 1990
 TSW becomes one of the first ITV companies to start broadcasting in NICAM digital stereo.
 1991
 16 October – The ITC announces that TSW has lost its licence. It loses out to Westcountry Television. Westcountry had tabled a lower bid but the ITC awarded the licence to Westcountry because it felt that TSW’s bid of £16.1 million was too high. Westcountry was the second highest of the other two applicants and was awarded the licence with a bid of £7.82 million.
 1992
 February – TSW’s appeal to have the ITC’s decision to relieve TSW of its licence fails when it is rejected by the House of Lords. 
 31 December – At just before midnight, TSW stops broadcasting as after the chimes of Big Ben, the new licensee, Westcountry takes over as franchise holder for south west England.
 After 1992
 TSW undertakes a reverse takeover with the White Ward Group, makers of safety footwear and associated articles. The name of the company was changed to UK Safety Ltd, and traded for a number of years, before entering administrative receivership.
 The directors of TSW create the TSW Film and Television Archive, one of the first and largest of what has now become a network of regional film archives. It was later renamed the South West Film and Television Archive (SWFTA) and it holds the entire surviving back catalogue of both Westward and TSW programmes

See also 
 History of ITV
 History of ITV television idents
 Timeline of ITV
 Timeline of Westcountry Television – TSW's successor

References

TSW
TSW